Lascoria cristata is a species of litter moth of the family Erebidae. It is found in Central America, including Panama and Costa Rica.

External links
Records from Costa Rica

Herminiinae
Moths described in 1916